, nicknamed "Dynamite Shingo", is a Japanese professional baseball player of the Yomiuri Giants for the Nippon Professional Baseball (NPB). He previously played for the Hokkaido Nippon Ham Fighters of Nippon Professional Baseball (NPB).

He debuted in 2013.

Professional career

Yomiuri Giants
On 2 November 2016, it was revealed that Ishikawa had been included in a trade with the Yomiuri Giants with Mitsuo Yoshikawa for Giants outfielder Taishi Ota and Katsuhiko Kumon.

International career
On November 16, 2018, he was selected Yomiuri Giants roster at the 2018 MLB Japan All-Star Series exhibition game against MLB All-Stars.

References

1993 births
Living people
Hokkaido Nippon-Ham Fighters players
Japanese baseball players
Nippon Professional Baseball outfielders
People from Sakai, Osaka
Baseball people from Osaka Prefecture
Yomiuri Giants players